Sparta Township is one of fourteen townships in Dearborn County, Indiana. As of the 2010 census, its population was 2,894 and it contained 1,144 housing units.

Geography

Cities and towns
 Moores Hill

Unincorporated towns
 Chesterville
 Cold Springs
 Dillsboro Station
 Sparta
(This list is based on USGS data and may include former settlements.)

Adjacent townships
 Manchester Township (northeast)
 Hogan Township (east)
 Washington Township (southeast)
 Clay Township (south)
 Washington Township, Ripley County (west)
 Franklin Township, Ripley County (northwest)

Major highways
  Indiana State Road 350

Cemeteries
The township contains fifteen cemeteries: Beatty, Bedunnah, Churchill, Concord, Eden, Forest Hill, Heaton, McKinstry, Olcott, Record, Todd, Transier, Turner, Union and Whiteford.

Education
Sparta Township residents may obtain a library card at the Aurora Public Library in Aurora.

References
 United States Census Bureau cartographic boundary files
 U.S. Board on Geographic Names

External links
 Indiana Township Association
 United Township Association of Indiana

Townships in Dearborn County, Indiana
Townships in Indiana